Choi Daniel (born 22 February 1986) is a South Korean actor, DJ and model. He is best known for his television roles in The Ghost Detective, Jugglers, High Kick Through the Roof, Baby Faced Beauty, School 2013, and rom-com film Cyrano Agency. He is also an anchorman on KBS World Radio since 2011 and a DJ on KBS 2FM since 2013.

Early life 
Choi's mother had serious morning sickness when pregnant with his elder brother (6 years his elder), thus did not consider having a second child. His father had a vasectomy, but Choi was still conceived. His father wanted to name him Solomon, but his mother preferred Daniel, as he was considered a gift from God.

As a child, his name was considered unusual, and his peers would call him "Yogi Daniel" (a famous yoga master and contortionist), and would jokingly ask him to squeeze himself into a desk.

Choi's mother died when he was 5 years old. Due to few recollections of his mother, later in life, he found it difficult to act opposite his characters' mother figures. After the death of his mother and his father's business went bankrupt, he was sent to his aunt's house, while his father and brother lived with another relative.

His first part-time job in high school was a gas station attendant.

He quit after one semester at the Broadcasting and Acting Department of Chungwoon University, as he had enough of the experience. He was part of the university's cheerleading team.

His father was in the Military Academy and his brother is a civil servant.

Conscription 
On 2 October 2015, Choi enlisted in the Republic of Korea Army to serve his mandatory military service. Due to a knee injury he suffered in late 2012 while shooting the drama “School 2013”, he was deemed unfit for physical duty. As alternative military duty, after four weeks of training, he was assigned to serve at the Seoul VHS Medical Center as a public service worker.

On 27 June 2017, he was the recipient of model public service worker commissioner’s award from the Military Manpower Administration at the Seoul Regional Office of the MMA, for being a model employee and sincere work ethic.

His original discharge date, 1 October 2017, was advanced 2 days due to the Chuseok holidays. His first project afterwards is Jugglers. His brother got married when he was filming the drama.

Filmography

Film

Television series

Web series

Music video
"Coin Laundry" (Wax, 2014) 
"Open The Door" (Im Chang-jung, 2013)
"Love Ballad" (Browneyed Soul, 2010)
"Turn It Up" (Sung Hyun-ah, 2004)

Radio
KBS World Radio - News Plus (2011~present)
KBS 2FM - Pops Pops (2013~present)
Radio Apart (30 Nov, 2018)

Discography
 "I went to Cheonggyesan Mt." - duet with Uhm Tae-woong, Cyrano Agency OST

Awards and nominations

References

External links

 
 
 Choi Daniel Fan Club at Daum
 
 
 

South Korean male film actors
South Korean male television actors
People from Seoul
1986 births

Living people